Charles Kaiser is an American author and journalist best known for his nonfiction books 1968 in America (1988), The Gay Metropolis (1997), and The Cost of Courage (2015). A former reporter for The New York Times, The Wall Street Journal, and Newsweek, he is currently a nonfiction book critic for The Guardian.

Biography
Kaiser was born in Washington, D.C., the son of Philip Mayer Kaiser, a United States diplomat, and Hannah Greeley Kaiser; he has two brothers, one of them the journalist Robert Kaiser. He grew up in Washington, Albany, New York, Dakar, Senegal, London, England, Windsor, Connecticut, and New York City. Kaiser graduated from Columbia University in 1972, and subsequently worked as a reporter for The New York Times, The Wall Street Journal, and Newsweek. As a freelance journalist, he has contributed to The Washington Post, the Los Angeles Times, the New York Observer, New York magazine, and Vanity Fair. His first book, 1968 in America, was published in 1988.

Kaiser's second book, The Gay Metropolis (1997), is a social history that traces the cultural accomplishments and increased social acceptance of gay people in America between the years 1940 and 1996. Kaiser later said that he wrote the book out of "an obligation to bear witness to what we had all lived through [during the AIDS epidemic]," explaining, "I wanted to write a book that would include AIDS, but not be overwhelmed by it". In 2007, an updated edition of The Gay Metropolis was published, and Kaiser appeared on The Colbert Report to promote the book. In 2019, The Guardian described the third updated edition of The Gay Metropolis as "one of the key popular studies of American social history [and] among the first accounts that sought to provide an extended history of gay life (admittedly mostly male) before and after Stonewall." Kaiser's book has also been cited for popularizing the theory that Judy Garland's funeral was one of the motivating factors behind the Stonewall riots.

From 2007 to 2011, Kaiser wrote Full Court Press, a blog about the media that appeared on Radar Online, the Columbia Journalism Review, and the Sidney Hillman Foundation website.

In 2012, Kaiser wrote the afterword for a new edition of Merle Miller's landmark 1971 work On Being Different: What it Means to Be a Homosexual.

Kaiser's third book, The Cost of Courage, follows the story of the Boulloches, a family who participated in the French Resistance. To research the book, Kaiser lived in France for two and a half years, interviewing surviving members of the Boulloche family and studying newly declassified documents from British intelligence agencies. The Cost of Courage was published in 2015 to enthusiastic reviews from The Washington Post, The Wall Street Journal, and The Christian Science Monitor. In 2015, Kaiser said that his next project would be "a big book about New York since 1970."

Kaiser has taught journalism at Columbia University and Princeton University; in 2018, he was named Acting Director of the LGBTQ Public Policy Center at Hunter College. He lives on the Upper West Side of Manhattan with his partner, the artist Joe Stouter.

Bibliography 
 1968 in America (1988)
 The Gay Metropolis (1997)
 The Cost of Courage (2015)

Honors
1997 Lambda Literary Award for Gay Studies (for The Gay Metropolis)
2015 Paris Book Festival Award for General Non-Fiction (for The Cost of Courage)
2015 Inducted into the LGBTQ Journalists Hall of Fame

References

External links

 Archive of articles from the Columbia Journalism Review
 Archive of articles from The Guardian
2010 interview from the Binghamton University Digital Collections

American male journalists
Living people
The New York Times writers
The Wall Street Journal people
Newsweek people
Loomis Chaffee School alumni
Columbia University alumni
Columbia University faculty
Princeton University faculty
Lambda Literary Award winners
American LGBT journalists
American gay writers
1950 births
People from the Upper West Side
21st-century LGBT people